The Gympie Local Heritage Register is a list of heritage sites within the Gympie Region, Queensland, Australia. It is maintained by the Gympie Regional Council.

The local heritage listings for the Gympie Region include:

 Amamoor:
 4 Busby Street: Amamoor General Store
 10 Busby Street: Amamoor Butcher Shop
 31-33 Busby Street: Amamoor Hall
2 Elizabeth Road: Amamoor State School
Brooloo:
 Mary Valley Road: Brooloo Hall
Cedar Pocket:
 Cedar Pocket Road: Cedar Pocket School of Arts
 Chatsworth:
 3 Allen Road: Chatsworth Hall
 15 Rammutt Road: Chatsworth School
Dagun:
 39 Dagun Road: Dagun State School
 Kimlin Lane: Dagun Railway Station
Downsfield:
 1726 Sandy Creek Road: Sandy Creek Hall
Glastonbury:
 1329 Glastonbury Road: Glastonbury Hall
 Gympie
 6 Bligh Street: Gympie Fire Station
 2 Caledonian Hill: Gympie City Town Hall
 15 Caledonian Hill: Salvation Army Temple
 24 Caledonian Hill: O’Donnel Residence
 Caledonian Hill: Gympie Public Toilet Blocks
 17 Calton Terrace: Cameron House
 Cartwright Road: Gympie West State School
 11 Channon Street: Kingston House
 Channon Street: Surface Hill Uniting Church
 20 Channon Street: Freemasons Hotel
 22 Channon Street: Former Gympie Post Office
 26 Channon Street: Gympie Lands Office
 38 Channon Street: Gympie Courthouse
 39 Channon Street: Gympie Masonic Hall
 45 Channon Street: Prangley and Crofts designed house
 18 Crescent Road: 1880s house
 11 Crown Road: Presbyterian Church
 17 Crown Road: Former Gympie Ambulance Station
 29 Duke Street: Drill Hall
 1 Everson Road: Gympie State High School
 24 Excelsior Road: House
 1 Ferguson Street: 1950s house
 3 Graham Street: House
 8 Graham Street: Shop
 9 Graham Street: Former Nashville Police Station
 10 Graham Street: House
 11 Graham Street: Former One Mile Post Office
 15 Graham Street: Shop
 32 Hilton Road: House
 11 Hughes Terrace: House
 7 John Street: One Mile State School
 15 Kidgell Street: House
 King Street: Gympie Police Station
 1 Lady Mary Terrace: Australian Hotel
 20 Lawrence Street: Gympie Central State School
 25 Mary Street: Shop
 62 – 76 Mary Street: Shop
 65 – 69 Mary Street: Patrick's Newsagency
 73 Mary Street: The Brown Jug Café
 92 Mary Street: Westpac Bank Building
 102 Mary Street: Wide Bay Capricorn Building
 104 Mary Street: Cullinanes Building
 135 Mary Street: Golden Age Hotel
 170 Mary Street: Billy's Hotel
 183 Mary Street: Mama & Papa's Pizzeria
 187 Mary Street: Formerly Kominsky's Store
 188 Mary Street: Royal Hotel
 199 Mary Street: Former Royal Bank
  201 Mary Street: Shop
 210 Mary Street: Victoria House
 214 Mary Street: Former Royal Exchange Hotel
 218 Mary Street: Jeffery and Cuddihy Building
 224 Mary Street: Shop
 230 Mary Street: Shop
 232 Mary Street: Shop
 Stanton and Parkinson Building:  236 Mary Street: Neilson
 242 Mary Street: Gympie Regional Council Chambers
 250 Mary Street: The Chambers Hotel
 Mellor Street: Council's Youth Development Office
 39 Monkland Road: Former Service Station
 69 Mount Pleasant Road: Mount Pleasant Hotel
 Nash Street: Old Bank Building
 4 Nash Street: House
 8 Nash Street: House
 39 Nash Street: Gympie Art Gallery
 6 Nelson Road: Gympie Cordial Factory
 29 Perseverance Street: Commercial premises
 60 Pine Street: House
 88 Pine Street: House
 11 Red Hill Road: Formerly Old Fellow's Hall
 23 Red Hill Road: Formerly Red Hill Recreation Hall
 37 Red Hill Road: Foresters Hall
 11 Reef Street: Shop
 24 Reef Street: Land and Engineering Surveyors
 River Road: Memorial Park Bandstand
 River Road: Albert Park
 1 Station Road: Railway Station Hotel
 4 – 6 Stephens Street: House
 4 Stewart Terrace: Former Gympie Fire Station
  10 Struan Street: House
 5 Tozer Street: Commercial premises
 25 Tozer Street: Tozer Street Warehouses
 28 Tozer Street: Tozer Street Railway Station
 53 Tozer Street: Wide Bay Co-Op Buildings
 12 Watt Street: House
 14 Watt Street: House
 18 Watt Street: House
Imbil:
 15 Edward Street: Imbil State School
 1 Elizabeth Road: Imbil Uniting Church
 William Street: Imbil Railway Station
 34 Williams Street: Imbil Masonic Hall
 95 Yabba Road: Imbil Police Station
 100 Yabba Road: Imbil General Store
 110 Yabba Road: Imbil Hotel
 112 Yabba Road: Former Empire Theatre
 116 Yabba Road: Libby's Country Kitchen
 122 Yabba Road: Imbil Butcher Shop
 127 Yabba Road: Imbil RSL Hall
Jones Hill:
 Waterworks Road: Jones Hill Reservoir
 Waterworks Road: Waterworks Pump House
 17 McIntosh Creek Road: Jones Hill School
Kandanga:
 Main Street: Kandanga Railway Station
 65 Main Street: Kandanga Cottage
 81 Main Street: Kandanga Memorial Hall
 84 – 86 Main Street: Kandanga State School
 41 – 45 Stephens Street: Sacred Heart Catholic Church
Kandanga Creek:
 307 Sterling Road: Former Kandanga Sawmill
 251 Sterling Road: Kandanga Creek Community Hall
 249 Sterling Creek Road: Kandanga Creek State School
 Kia Ora:
 2572 Anderleigh Road: Kia Ora School
 McCarthy Road: Kia Ora Methodist Church
Kybong:
 Bruce Highway: Kybong Hall
Langshaw:
 Upper Eel Creek Road: Langshaw Hall
 1574 Eel Creek Road: Langshaw State School
Long Flat:
 Mary Valley Road: Lagoon Pocket Methodist Church
 705 Mary Valley Road: Long Flat Hall
Monkland:
 Brisbane Road: Monkland Railway Station
 Brisbane Road: Monkland State School
 Brisbane Road: Monkland School Residence
 Brisbane Road: No. 01 Scottish Gympie Gold Mine
 208 Brisbane Road: Inglewood Hill Pottery
Mooloo:
 Mooloo Road: Mooloo Hall
Mothan Mountain:
 Noosa Road: Mothar Mountain Hall
Southside:
 50 Exhibition Road: Southside State School
Tin Can Bay:
 Cod Street: Tin Can Bay Picnic Shelter
 Gympie Road: Tin Can Bay Memorial Hall
 22 – 24 Gympie Road: Tin Can Bay Church
 Traveston:
 Alford Street: Traveston Railway Station
 1813 Bruce Highway: Traveston Homestead
 Traveston Road: Traveston Public Hall
Two Mile:
 288 Bruce Highway: Two Mile School
Veteran:
 Sandy Creek Road: Veteran School of Arts Hall
Widgee Crossing North:
 260 Widgee Crossing Road: Former Widgee Crossing Shops
Wolvi:
 Kin Kin Road: Wolvi Hall
 936 Kin Kin Road: Wolvi State School
 888 Kin Kin Road: Wolvi Sawmill

References 

Gympie Region
Local heritage registers in Queensland